Canmore may refer to:
Canmore (database), a Scottish national online database of ancient monuments;
Canmore, Alberta, a town in Canada;
the House of Dunkeld, a royal house that ruled Scotland in the 11th, 12th and 13th centuries, including
Malcolm III of Scotland, nicknamed Malcolm Canmore, King of Scots 1058–1093; and
Malcolm IV of Scotland, also known as Malcolm Canmore, King of Scots 1153–1165;
the University of St Andrews Catholic Chaplaincy, nicknamed Canmore, a chaplaincy in St. Andrews, Scotland.